Aphelochaeta guimondi is a species of bitentaculate cirratulidan first found in the Pacific coast of Costa Rica, at a shallow subtidal depth of about  in the Gulf of Nicoya. It is characterised by possessing a wide dorsal trough in its thorax and hirsute capillaries.

References

Terebellida